Captain Fly-by-Night is a 1922 American silent adventure film directed by William K. Howard and starring Johnnie Walker, Francis McDonald, and Shannon Day. Set in historic Spanish California, it was inspired by the success of the 1920 film The Mark of Zorro, and was based upon a novel of the same name by Johnston McCulley. The film has been released on dvd.

Cast
 Johnnie Walker as First Stranger 
 Francis McDonald as Second Stranger 
 Shannon Day as Señorita Fernandez 
 Eddie Gribbon as Sgt. Cassara 
 Victory Bateman as Señora 
 James McElhern as Padre Miguel 
 Charles Stevens as Indian 
 Bert Wheeler as Governor 
 Fred Kelsey as Gomez
 Monte Collins as Drunk (uncredited)
 Kit Guard as Indian (uncredited)
 Noble Johnson as Indian (uncredited)

References

Bibliography
 Munden, Kenneth White. The American Film Institute Catalog of Motion Pictures Produced in the United States, Part 1. University of California Press, 1997.

External links

1922 films
1920s historical adventure films
American historical adventure films
Films directed by William K. Howard
American silent feature films
Film Booking Offices of America films
Films set in the 19th century
Films based on works by Johnston McCulley
1920s English-language films
1920s American films
Silent historical adventure films